Jackie Cruz (born August 8, 1986) is a Dominican–American actress, singer and former model. She is known for her role as Marisol "Flaca" Gonzales on the Netflix original series Orange Is the New Black.

Early life
Born Jacqueline Chavez in Queens, New York on August 8, 1986, Cruz grew up between Los Angeles, California, and Santiago, Dominican Republic. She was raised by a single mother, and she speaks fluent English and Spanish. Cruz was inspired to become an entertainer at the age of seven after watching Whitney Houston in The Bodyguard. She attended Alexander Hamilton High School in Los Angeles, where she was a member of the school's music academy.

At age 16, Cruz moved out of her mother's apartment and became homeless. When she was 17, she was the victim of a car accident where she suffered a collapsed lung, fell into a coma and required brain surgery. Her song "Sweet Sixteen" is based on the incident.

Music career
When Cruz was in high school, she worked with will.i.am's producers in a girl group called Krush Velvet, although the group never signed to a record label. Her debut extended play, Hollywood Gypsy, was released independently in 2010.

Cruz is a part of a band called "The Family Portrait".

Acting career
In 2009, Cruz began making appearances on the E! television series Kourtney and Khloé Take Miami. She and Kourtney Kardashian became friends after meeting in an art class, which led to further appearances on the series. In one episode, Cruz and Kardashian were filmed kissing, an incident that Kardashian later stated she was "so embarrassed" by. Although Cruz initially stated that she and Kardashian remained friends following the incident, Kardashian later stated that she "can never talk to [Cruz] again".

Cruz cites Rita Moreno as an acting influence.

Cruz was working as a model and a waitress at New York City restaurant Lavo before she was cast as Marisol "Flaca" Gonzales on the Netflix series Orange Is the New Black. Originally a recurring character for the first three seasons, it was announced in April 2015 that she would be promoted to series regular for the fourth season.

In May 2022, she wrapped filming on the horror-thriller History of Evil. Her recasting into the role wasn’t known until afterward.

Personal life
In 2016, Cruz told AfterEllen: "I like the person whether it's a woman—we don't like to be labeled. I'm in a relationship with a man right now, but I've liked women in the past. So I guess we don't want to be labeled. We don't really talk about it, but the actions speak louder than words, am I right? So you're seeing it. You're living it."

In August 2020, Cruz married artist Fernando Garcia. In December 2021, Cruz and Garcia announced they're expecting twins. In March 2022, Cruz announced on Instagram that she had welcomed her twins.

Discography
 Hollywood Gypsy (2010)

Singles

Filmography

Film

Television

References

External links

1986 births
Actresses from Los Angeles
Actresses from New York City
Alexander Hamilton High School (Los Angeles) alumni
Hispanic and Latino American female models
Hispanic and Latino American women singers
Hispanic and Latino American actresses
LGBT Hispanic and Latino American people
LGBT models
LGBT people from New York (state)
American LGBT singers
Living people
Models from Los Angeles
Models from New York City
People from Queens, New York
Singers from Los Angeles
Singers from New York City
21st-century American singers
21st-century American women singers